Aloepi 2 is a village where mainly members of the Tiriyó tribe live. It is located in the resort Tapanahony in the extreme south of the Surinamese district Sipaliwini. Aloepi 2 is a twin village together with Aloepi 1.

References

Indigenous villages in Suriname
Populated places in Sipaliwini District